Tranmere Rovers F.C. played the 1981–82 season in the Football League Fourth Division, where they finished 11th of 24. They reached the First Round of the FA Cup, and the Fourth Round of the League Cup.

League table

References 

Tranmere Rovers F.C. seasons